Josip Kuna (born 13 March 1972) is a Croatian sport shooter.

He participated at the 2018 ISSF World Shooting Championships, winning a medal.

References

External links

Living people
1972 births
Croatian male sport shooters
ISSF rifle shooters
Sportspeople from Osijek